Sungho (성호그룹) is a South Korean company headquartered in Gyeongju, South Korea.

Sungho Group was founded by Son Myoung Ik in November 1994 as a steel scrap company known as "Daeho Steel". In 2002 Daeho Steel incorporated into "Sungho Co., LTD. By 2010 Sungho Co. was known as the largest steel scrap company in South Company supplying around 1,000,000 MT of steel scrap yearly. During the last two decades Sungho Group has diversified its business into many subsidiaries including recycling, metal abrasives, castings, automotive parts, plant, construction and a resort.

History

1994–2002 

In November 1994 Son Myoung Ik first founded Daeho Steel as a steel scrap company. During August 2002 he incorporated Daeho Steel into Sungho Co., Ltd.

2006–2009

In March 2006 Sungho expanded its business into construction. March 2007 Sungho Co. acquired the ISO9001 and TS16949. In January 2009 Sungho Co. acquired Taekwang Cast Iron and established it into Sungho Metal.

2010–2012

2013–2015

Sungho Resort 
The construction of Sungho Resort at Gyeongju, South Korea was completed in February 2013.

Subsidiaries and affiliates

Sungho Metal 
Since establishment in 1978, Sungho Metal produces yearly 26,000 ton of automotive parts and various industrial items.

Sungho Steel 
Since 2006,  Sungho Metal distributes rebar and other steel products to construction sites.
section steel

Sungho Construction 
Sungho Construction is best known for its role in building many factories, apartments, and office buildings. From the year 2006 Sungho Construction completed many projects such as the Dorisa Temple, the First Introduction Site of Buddhism in Silla Period,

Sungho Recycling 
Established in 2015, Sungho Recycling is responsible for the stable supply of 1 million tons of steel scrap to the steel mills in South Korea.

Main clients 

 Posco
 Hyundai Steel
 Dongkuk Steel
 Hyundai Heavy Industries
 Daewoo Shipbuilding & Marine Engineering
 DSME
 Samsung Heavy Industries
 Hanjin Heavy Industries
 Hyundai 
 Hyundai Wia 
 Mando Corp.

International clients 

 Isuzu
 Kobelco
 Hitachi
 Nippon Steel
 Toyota
 Mitsubishi
 Citizen
 Shimano
 Keppel
 Kawasaki
 Nissan

References

External links 
Sungho
 https://www.steeldaily.co.kr/news/n_view.asp?NewsID=99935&Page=1&T_M_Code=0&D_F_Code=Main

Gyeongju
Companies of South Korea
South Korean companies established in 1994
Manufacturing companies established in 1994